Robla may refer to:

 Robla, Sacramento, California, a neighborhood of Sacramento
 Robla Elementary School District, Sacramento County, California
 La Robla, Spain, a municipality